FUBAR is a military acronym for "fucked up beyond all repair". See .

FUBAR or fubar may also refer to:

 FUBAR (film), a 2002 Canadian mockumentary film
Fubar: The Album, the film's soundtrack album
FUBAR 2, the 2010 sequel to the film
Fubar Age of Computer, a 2017 television series
 Fubar Films, an Irish film and television production company based in Dublin
 FUBAR (TV series), an upcoming Netflix television series
 F.U.B.A.R.: America's Right-Wing Nightmare, a 2006 book by Sam Seder and Stephen Sherrill

See also
 Foobar
 Foo (disambiguation)